Critical Condition is a 1987 American comedy film starring Richard Pryor and directed by Michael Apted. The film was released in the United States on January 16, 1987.

Plot
Kevin Lenahan is a con man who is framed in a jewel robbery. To escape custody, before he fakes insanity and then poses as surgeon Dr. Eddie Slattery at a local hospital when he switches places with the administrator Arthur Chambers. During a flood and a power outage that follows, Kevin takes charge of the hospital and tries to maintain some order in his unorthodox way.

Cast

Music
In 2014, Alan Silvestri's score was released on a limited edition album by Quartet Records, twinned with his music for Summer Rental.

Reception

Box office
The film debuted at No.1 with $5.7 million.

Critical response
The New York Times film critic Janet Maslin remarked, "No one in Critical Condition, which opens today at Loews State and other theaters, is working at top form, least of all Mr. Pryor, who looks haggard and agitated much of the time. Still, the film does have an interesting cast and an energetic tempo." The Los Angeles Times wrote that Pryor's performance "is as good as anything he's done in a non-concert movie" but "it still somehow misfires". The South Florida Sun-Sentinel called it a "misguided semicomedy" and wrote, "Judging from this lamebrained film, Richard Pryor's crown as a screen comedy king is slipping off his head." The Chicago Tribunes Dave Kehr wrote that the film "adds, with what has become a glum predictability, one more disappointing title to Richard Pryor's credits".  Kehr suggested that Pryor's stage persona, more able to work off immediate audience feedback, worked better than his film persona, with which he "musters only an unctuous sweetness".

See also
 List of American films of 1987
 List of comedy films of 1987

References

External links
 
 
 

1987 films
1987 comedy films
American comedy films
American disaster films
Films scored by Alan Silvestri
Films about con artists
Films directed by Michael Apted
Films set in hospitals
Films set in Manhattan
Films set in New York City
Films shot in New York City
Films set in North Carolina
Films shot in North Carolina
Medical-themed films
Paramount Pictures films
1980s English-language films
1980s American films
Disaster comedy films